Bote may refer to

Places
Bote Mountain in the United States
Qafë Botë, a mountain pass through the Albanian mountains

People
José Solano y Bote (1726–1806), Spanish naval officer
David Bote, American baseball player
Bote & Bock, a German publishing house

Publications
Der Elsässer Bote, a defunct German-language daily newspaper in France
Der Bote (the Messager), a defunct German-language newspaper in Canada
Hinkender Bote, the title of several almanacs which appeared in Switzerland in 17th–18th centuries

Other uses
bote, an Old English word for estovers: house-bote, cart or plough-bote, hedge or hay-bote, and fire-bote
"Botë, a song by Lindita and a Eurovision Song Contest entry
Bote-Darai language of Nepal
Bote, a 2022 multi genre film starring action star orthopaedic doctor Khaleel Kman

See also
Inday Bote, a 2015 Philippine fantasy comedy-drama television series 
Porta-bote, a boat
Ribeira Bote, an association football club in Cape Verde
Botte (disambiguation)